The 2009 Liga de Fútbol Profesional Boliviano season was the 33rd of Bolivia's top-flight professional football league. The season was split into two championships—the Apertura and the Clausura—and the Play-off

Format
The 2009 season will be divided into two championships, each with their own format.

Apertura

The Apertura championship will be a double round-robin league format. The team with the most points after the twenty-two rounds will be declared the champion.

Clausura

The Clausura championship will be divided into two phases. The first phase will have the twelve team divided into two groups. The teams will play within each group, in addition to a cross-group rivalry (for example: Bolívar vs. The Strongest). The best three teams in each group will advance to the second phase. In the second phase, the best teams from each group will play  the third best team from each group and the second best teams will play each other. The three winners of each match, plus the best loser, then play each other in the semifinals and will start of a two-legged single-elimination play-off that culminates in a final match-up. The winner of the final is the tournament champion.

The winners of each championship will earn a berth in the 2010 Copa Libertadores and the runners-up will earn a berth in the 2010 Copa Sudamericana.

Teams
The amount of team remains the same for this season. Guabirá was relegated at the end of the 2008 season to the regional leagues. They were replaced by Nacional Potosí.

Managerial changes

Torneo Apertura
The Torneo Apertura was the first championship of the season. It began on February 7 and ended on July 6.

Standings

Results

Top-five goalscorers

Torneo Clausura
The Torneo Clausura is the second championship of the season. It began on July 18 and is scheduled to end in December.

First phase

Serie A

Standings

Results

Serie B

Standings

Results

Inter-series
{| class="wikitable"
|-
!width=250| Home team
!width=50| Results
!width=250| Away team
|-
!colspan=3| —
|-

|-

|-
!colspan=3| —
|-

|-

|-
!colspan=3| —
|-

|-

|-
!colspan=3| —
|-

|-

|-
!colspan=3| —
|-

|-

|-
!colspan=3| —
|-

|-

Second phase
Bolívar, Real Potosí, Oriente Petrolero, Blooming and The Strongest have advanced to the Second Phase of the championship. All games were played at the UTC-3 time zone.

Semifinals
At this stage winner will face the best that qualified as best loser, while the other two qualifiers play each other. The games are round, "said the chairman of the Technical Committee of the League, Felipe Rodriguez. At this stage remains the system applied in the Copa Libertadores. Bolívar qualified as the best loser.

Finals

Blooming qualified for 2010 Copa Libertadores Second Stage.
Oriente Petrolero qualified for 2010 Copa Sudamericana First Stage.

Top-five goalscorers

Relegation table

Relegation/promotion playoff
Jorge Wilstermann will compete in a relegation/promotion playoff against the runner-up of the  2009 Copa Simón Bolívar.

Torneo play-off

First round
The First Round of the play-off began on October 31 and is scheduled to end on November 5. Team #1 will play the second leg at home. Real Potosí received a bye into the next round and Nacional Potosí could not participate since they were relegated.

Teams in bold advanced to the quarterfinals. Team in italics went to the Loser's Round.

Loser's Round
The Loser's Round is contested between the four best losers from the First Round. The two winners will advance to the "regular" semifinals.

Semifinals
The first leg was played on November 8, with the second leg played on November 14 and 15. Team #1 played the second leg at home.

Finals
The first leg is scheduled for November 18, with the second leg for November 22. Team #1 played the second leg at home. The winner advanced to the Semifinals.

Quarterfinals
The first legs of the quarterfinals is scheduled for November 7 and 8, with the date for the second leg to be determined. Team #1 will play the second leg at home.

Semifinals
The Semifinals began on November 21 and is scheduled to end on November 29. Team #1 will play the first leg at home. Unlike in other rounds, if both teams are tied on points, a playoff will be played at a neutral venue.

Finals

Real Potosí qualified for 2010 Copa Libertadores First Stage.

References

External links
 Facetas Deportivas

Bolivian Primera División seasons
1